A Capitol Fourth is an annual Independence Day concert special broadcast by PBS. It is presented from the west lawn of the United States Capitol Building in Washington, D.C., and is also simulcast by NPR and the American Forces Network.

The concert typically features performances by guest musicians, as well as the 3rd U.S. Infantry Regiment (The Old Guard), the United States Army Presidential Salute Guns Battery, the U.S. Army Band (Pershing's Own), the National Symphony Orchestra, U.S. Army Herald Trumpets and the Choral Arts Society of Washington.

One journalist described the event as "a mix of patriotism and pop culture ... as the National Symphony Orchestra launched into Tchaikovsky's 1812 Overture with accompaniment from an Army artillery squad, a spectacular fireworks display erupted over the Washington Monument. There was something special about being in the nation's capital on Independence Day, surrounded by a few hundred thousand of our fellow citizens."

History
The National Symphony Orchestra began performing Independence Day concerts on the west lawn in 1979. Two years later, the first concert telecast was hosted by E. G. Marshall, with conductor Mstislav Rostropovich and performer Pearl Bailey. It is now the highest-rated show on PBS.

In 2019, the concert was held alongside Salute to America, a separate Independence Day event organized primarily by then-President Donald Trump. The organizers of A Capitol Fourth indicated that their show remains an independent production that is not affiliated with Trump's event.

In 2020, the in-person concert was cancelled due to the COVID-19 pandemic, although some performances were still recorded live remotely. The special instead incorporated pre-recorded performances (including one that paid tribute to first responders), although the fireworks on the Capitol were still broadcast live. Although restrictions have since been lifted in Washington, D.C., the in-person concert was cancelled again for 2021, as the show had already been planned in advance under the presumption that the in-person concert could not be held. In 2022, after two years of cancellation of the in-person concert, the show returned to the West Lawn of the Capitol.

Cast

Hosts
Tony Danza has served as host twice, in 1998 and 2007. Barry Bostwick hosted during several consecutive years prior to 2006, when Jason Alexander hosted. After Danza's second time, Jimmy Smits hosted for the following four years. Tom Bergeron hosted from 2012 to 2014, and again in 2016. Bradley Whitford served as host in 2015. John Stamos hosted in 2017, 2018, and 2019, and co-hosted with Vanessa Williams in 2020. Williams hosted the show in 2021, and also performed "God Bless America" and "Lift Every Voice and Sing". The 2022 edition was hosted by Mickey Guyton. Erich Kunzel was music director until his death in 2009. Jack Everly took over as music director.

Performers
Performers over the years have included Roberta Flack and Marvin Hamlisch (1987); Lee Ann Womack and Ray Charles (2000); Chuck Berry and Aretha Franklin (2002); John Williams, Dolly Parton and Kristin Chenoweth (2003); Robin Gibb and Clay Aiken (2004); Stevie Wonder (2006); Hayden Panettiere, Little Richard, and Bebe Neuwirth (2007); Huey Lewis and the News, Taylor Hicks, and Jerry Lee Lewis (2008); Aretha Franklin, Barry Manilow, Andrew von Oeyen, and the cast of Jersey Boys (2009); Gladys Knight, Lang Lang, and Reba McEntire (2010); Jordin Sparks, Kelli O'Hara, Matthew Morrison, Steve Martin, and the Steep Canyon Rangers; Josh Groban, Little Richard, and the cast of Million Dollar Quartet (2011); Megan Hilty, Phillip Phillips, Matthew Broderick, Kelli O’Hara, Javier Colón, Kool & the Gang, Apolo Ohno, and John Williams (2012); and Williams, Hilty, Manilow, Neil Diamond, Jackie Evancho, Candice Glover, Scotty McCreery, and the cast of Motown: The Musical (2013).

The 2017 performers included The Beach Boys (with Mark McGrath and host John Stamos, who played drums and guitar), The Four Tops, Dan Aykroyd and Jim Belushi as The Blues Brothers, Kellie Pickler (her dress rehearsal performance was shown due to Pickler's illness), Trace Adkins, Yolanda Adams, Chris Blue, Sam Moore, Laura Osnes, and Sofia Carson, who performed the national anthem.

Traditions
The concert usually begins with the American national anthem by the National Symphony Orchestra and the U.S. Army Herald Trumpets, accompanied by a recording artist. Following live entertainment, its finale begins with a rendition of Tchaikovsky's 1812 Overture by the National Symphony Orchestra (complete with cannon fire from the United States Army Presidential Salute Guns Battery and the concluding verse sung by the Choral Arts Society of Washington), and the National Park Service's fireworks show above the Washington Monument. Following the 1812 Overture, a series of John Philip Sousa's best-known marches are played.

National anthem performers
1980: Pearl Bailey
1998: Sandi Patty
2000: Audra McDonald
2003: Barry Bostwick
2004: Clay Aiken
2006: JoJo
2007: Hayden Panettiere
2009: Aretha Franklin
2010: David Archuleta
2011: Jordin Sparks
2012: Josh Turner
2013: Jackie Evancho
2014: John Williams
2015: Nicole Scherzinger
2016: Alisan Porter
2017: Sofia Carson
2018: Kyla Jade
2019: Maelyn Jarmon
2020: Mandy Gonzalez
2021: Renée Fleming
2022: Mickey Guyton

The National Artistic Achievement Award
The National Artistic Achievement Award has been presented on six occasions during the program for the performer's "dedication to enriching the national legacy of the performing arts":

2003: John Williams
2005: Gloria Estefan & Emilio Estefan
2006: Stevie Wonder
2010: Reba McEntire
2011: Josh Groban
2018: The Beach Boys

See also
National Memorial Day Concert

References

External links
 
 

1980 American television series debuts
1980s American television series
1990s American television series
2000s American television series
2010s American television series
2020s American television series
American annual television specials
Music television specials
Concerts in the United States
Independence Day (United States) festivals
United States Capitol
Television shows filmed in Washington, D.C.
PBS original programming
National Symphony Orchestra